Jack Mahfar, an Iranian businessman, was born in 1931 in Esfahan, Iran. He started his pharmaceutical business in Tehran and was working for the foundation of a pharmaceutical products factory for the state. Due to the Revolution in Iran he had to terminate the project.

Career
His first experience with the medical and pharmaceutical business started when Dr. Manzourollah, would visit patients on his “mobile clinic” (a bicycle) in the suburbs of Esfahan. Dr. Manzourollah invited Jack, through his father, to assist him during the summer vacation. He paid Jack with a small portion of chicken, eggs and other products that he would receive from the villagers in return for medical treatment. Later on, as a peddler, he started his own “business” on the streets, selling beauty supply products such as soap and hairbrushes. In 1948, Jack's father was affected by bone tuberculosis, an almost incurable disease at the time in Iran. After no response to treatment in Esfahan, he was transferred and hospitalized in Tehran. As a result, Jack had to put the 11th grade on hold so that he can start working to provide a living for the family and take care of his father's treatment.

In Tehran, he started working as a helper to Dr. Moussa Bral (Bar-El), at his private pharmacy. Although he was being paid only 3 Toumans (the Iranian unit of currency) per 16 hours of work a day, he gained experience in the pharmaceutical business. Jack started an independent business named Mahfar Co. and later became the representative of several pharmaceutical companies, including Astra of Sweden. The expansion of the company soon involved hiring doctors, marketing agents, and staff members. In the following stages, he started the production of some drugs with licenses from European companies.

At the peak of the business, Jack Mahfar started his philanthropic contribution to the community. To start with, he made the majority of his staff homeowners. Per the request of the Iranian government, he initiated the building, and soon after, the presentation of ten schools to the less fortunate villages in Iran. He was involved with the establishment of a nursing home for aging seniors in Tehran and assisted in building three Jewish schools.

In later years, he submitted his proposition for establishment of a pharmaceutical factory inside Iran. The project was ordered by King Mohammad-Reza Shahm to Lieutenant-general Doctor Abdolkarim Ayadi, Shah's personal physician, and at the Chief of the Army medical and pharmaceutical department. The goal was to initiate the production of the most needed drugs in the country. The goal was competing with imported drugs, bringing down the price of prescription drugs for consumers inside the country, and savings in foreign currency. This would also result in the importing of advanced technology and subsequent future progress in techniques and production. Astra, the Swedish company, was the first foreign company in Iran that welcomed this project, followed by the endorsement of companies from Switzerland, Netherlands and Italy. The Iranian Army Supplies Department, in charge of providing the Army with medical supplies, was to cooperate with the above project and export to neighboring countries as well. The preliminary sections of the project were taken care of, and a contract was signed with Astra, which was approved by the Shah. However, the plan was terminated due to the unstable conditions in Iran at the time, which led to the Islamic Revolution led by Khomeini in February 1979.

During his life in Iran, Jack Mahfar was acquainted with several Iranian high-rank officials, especially with those active in the medical and pharmaceutical fields, including Dr. Manuchehr Eghbal, who was the Prime Minister in 1957, General Dr. Ayadi in military medical care, and Dr. Jahanshah Saleh who was the Minister of Public Health.

Jack Mahfar was a distinguished members of the Iranian Jewish community, and his contributions to the Jewish society was appreciated by Habib Elghanyan, the President of Jewish Committee and Chief Rabbi Yadidia Shofet, the ritual leader.

Emigration from Iran
A short time after the Islamic Revolution, the new Iranian government took over all the manufacturing and commercial companies in the country, including the company of Mr. Mahfar. He was asked to give up his pharmaceutical business to the government along with all related rights. he had no other option but to yield. Jack Mahfar, along with the Iranian Islamic officials, left for Sweden, Switzerland and other European countries, in order to arrange the transfer of all the business agencies to the Iranian Islamic authorities. 
Short thereafter, in July 1979, Jack Mahfar and his family left Iran, in distress, for exile. They first landed in Los Angeles, but after a short stay, they decided to move to another location. They finally chose Geneva as their permanent residence.
Shortly after settling in his new place, Jack Mahfar was able to start his own pharmaceutical business, again from scratch, which turned out to be successful. He was acquainted with well-known Jewish personalities in Switzerland and started to cooperate with them in social activities. One of these well-known personalities was Moris Abrams, former US Ambassador to the European Section of the United Nations, and founder of a humanitarian group known as UN Watch.

Medals and awards
Mahfar also has a very close relationship with the Jewish organizations in France. With their help, led by the Chief Rabbi of France and cooperation of the French President, he assisted the release of the thirteen Iranian Jews who had been arrested in Shiraz by the Iranian Islamic government on baseless allegations of spying for Israel. Throughout these efforts, he also reached Kofi Annan, the United Nations Secretary-General at the time, for help. Jack Mahfar was nominated for and received the Legion of Honor Award from President Nicolas Sarkozy, the then President of France, in recognition of his quality philanthropic contributions. In Israel, he also initiated the building of two synagogues, and provided financial support for several medical treatment centers, and established dental clinics in the less fortunate areas of the country. In the field of cultural and educational assistance, he helped with the publication of tens of books. As a member of the Board of Trustees of the Encyclopædia Iranica, headquartered in New York, Jack Mahfar made an outstanding contribution to the Iranian culture.

Following all these services, President Shimon Peres bestowed Jack Mahfar with the President's Award of Distinction on January 30, 2014, which is the nation's highest civilian award. Jack Mahfar was one of the six non-Israelis who received this distinguished award, along with Dr. Henry Kissinger, President Bill Clinton, President Barack Obama, and German Chancellor Angela Merkel.

Sources
 From Laborer to Entrepreneur, Memoirs of Jack Mahfar, First Edition, Fall 2013 http://jmahfar.com/english.html
 اعطای مدال افتخار ریاست جمهوری اسرائیل به ژاک ماهفر یهودی http://mfa.gov.il/MFAFA/IsraelExperience/IraniansInIsrael/Pages/20140130-Peres-Mahfar.aspx
 از کارگری تا کارآفرینی - خاطرات ژاک ماهفر - بازگشت به .. http://jmahfar.com/world-personality.html
 رونمایی از کتابی تازه درباره زندگی یهودیان ایران‌زمین - رادیو فردا http://www.radiofarda.com/content/f2_iran_losangeles_ehsan_yarshater_jewish_communities_hooman_sarshar/24374361.html
 گفتگوی رادیو اسرائیل با آقای منشه امیر درباره کتاب و ... https://www.youtube.com/watch?v=8OJC_YPxEyA
 نقد و معرفی : امیر حسین دیانی http://rahavard.com/Reviews/99-Review-Mahfar.pdf
 یک ایرانی، به زودی بزرگ ترین نشان افتخار فرانسه را می گیرد https://faryadiran.wordpress.com/

Living people
1931 births